The Tooheys New Cup, or TNC, was a rugby union competition established by the New South Wales Rugby Union (NSWRU) in 2002. Played in the second half of the rugby season after the Super 12 competition was completed, it was intended as a stepping stone between the existing grade rugby (see Shute Shield) and Super Rugby competitions. The Tooheys New Cup ran for five seasons before it ceased to exist, with the short-lived Australian Rugby Championship taking its place in the second half of the rugby season of 2007. From 2008 onwards, an extended Shute Shield covered the entire season.

Open to the existing twelve grade clubs, the TNC featured Super Rugby players not on international duty and the occasional Wallaby. In seasons 2004-2005 the Canberra Vikings competed in the Tooheys New Cup, in the 2005-2006 & 2007 the Central Coast Waves & Illawarra Warriors took part in addition to the Sydney-based sides.

Tooheys New Cup Grand Finals
2002 - Eastwood 19 Sydney University 15
2003 - Eastwood 29 Randwick 14
2004 - Randwick 35 Eastwood 22
2005 - Sydney University 41 Eastwood 5
2006 - Sydney University 16 Randwick 10

Tooheys New Cup Teams
Eastern Suburbs RUFC
Eastwood Rugby Club
Gordon RFC
Manly RUFC
Northern Suburbs Rugby Club
Parramatta Two Blues
Penrith Emus Rugby
Randwick Rugby Club
Southern Districts Rugby Club
Sydney University Football Club
Warringah Rugby Club
West Harbour RFC

See also
New South Wales Rugby Union
Shute Shield

External links
 Cup history from NSWRugby.com

Rugby union competitions in New South Wales
2002 establishments in Australia
Sports leagues established in 2002